Gyebaek is a 2011 South Korean period drama series, starring Lee Seo-jin, Cho Jae-hyun, Song Ji-hyo and Oh Yeon-soo . It aired on MBC from July 23 to November 22, 2011 on Mondays and Tuesdays at 21:55 for 32 episodes.

The series was filmed at MBC Dramia in Gyeonggi Province.

Plot
Set in the Baekje kingdom in the mid-7th century, the drama chronicles the life and times of the storied warrior great General Gyebaek who is remembered in history for leading Baekje's last stand against the Silla in the Battle of Hwangsanbeol. Gyebaek dies at the final battle with Silla kingdom.

Cast
Lee Seo-jin as Gyebaek – The last general of the Bakjae, who was a great tactician of war that he ones defeated Silla army with thousands of soldiers with mere 20 soldiers and as well a honest man. His first love is Eun ko, who later becomes the queen of king Ui-Ja, who is the last ruler of the Bakjae which disappoints Gyebaek to death. He later marries Cho Young and has 2 children with her. In his blink of death the only thing comes to his mind is his wife and two children.
Lee Hyun-woo as teen Gyebaek
Cho Jae-hyun as King Uija the last ruler of Bakjae – The son of King Mu and Queen Seonhwa who was once a princess of Silla. He is the last ruler of Bakjae who consider Gyabaek as his own younger brother. Gyabaeks father was a general when Ui-ja's father was the king that king Mu (ui-jas father) same like Ui-Ja considers Gyebaeks father Mu-Jin  as his younger brother and also Ui-Ja considers him as the most precious person in the world for him. He is a wise character who pretends to be mad when he was a prince to be safe from his step mother Sa taek bi the second queen of king Mu and the lover of Mu jin who is Gyebaeks father when they were young, but Mu jin discarded her after a displacement of a cruel act which she does because of her love for Mu jin. Ui Ja also loves Eun ko that he makes her his concubine when he is the crown prince which also diminished Ui ja and Gyebaeks relationship.
Choi Won-hong as child Uija
Noh Young-hak as teen Uija
Song Ji-hyo as Queen Eun'go (The last queen of Bakjae) – Gyabaeks first love. A wise and rightful women (not very friendly with people) who later becomes an evil and the one who is responsible for downfall of great Bakjae kingdom (she deals with silla for her greedy ambitions). Her father was executed by Sa Taek Bi for writing a petition against framing Gyebaeks father General Mu-Jin and Ui-Jas mother Queen seonhwa whom were framed as Silla spies. Later she and her mother, who were sold as slaves, were bought by a lady and Eun ko was later made the head of merchant guild. 
Jeon Min-seo as child Eun-ko
Park Eun-bin as teen Eun-ko
Oh Yeon-soo as Sa Taek-bi-second wife of King Mu who later becomes 2nd Queen of Bakjae. Her family controls Bakjae that king has turned into a puppet with no power despite his brain and skills. She never underestimates king that she knows what he is capable of. She had deep feelings for Mu jin who is the father of Gyebaek, but ultimately becomes King Mu's 2nd wife concubine Sa and also the master of Wi-je group a group which says that exists for the betterment of Bakjae but only do evil deeds. She was discarded by Mu jin despite her pure love for Mu-Jin since her evilness. She is a wise character that cannot be deceived easily.
Hyomin as Cho-young (Gyebaek's Wife) love and wife of Gyebaek. She has a special ability in martial arts. She was the servant of Eun ko whom Gyebaek loved first. She secretly loved Gyebaek back when Eun ko and Gyebaek was in love. Later she leaves Eun ko and becomes a military officer of Gyebaeks army. Later on she comes into bad terms with Eun ko. Cho Young pleads Eun-ko on the day of her bestowment as queen to help Gyabeak when he was being discharged of all military responsibilities because of king Ui-Ja becomes envious of the respect and honour towards Gyebaek from the Bakjae subjects. But she refuses and after several incidents while king was going to kill Gyebaek Cho Young tries to stop him and the king after being furious strike Cho Young with a sword then tell all of them to go far away and not to appear before him (but later on king Ui-Ja summons Gyabeak again). After regaining consciousness Cho Young confesses her love to Gyebaek and after that they marry and have two children. 
Han Bo-bae as teen Cho-young 
Jin Tae-hyun as Gyo-ki-Ui-Jas half brother, the son of King Mu and Sa taek bi. A character who is a pure evil who considers his half brother Ui-Ja as his opponent to the crown.
Nam Da-reum as child Gyo-ki 
Seo Young-joo as teen Gyo-ki
Choi Jong-hwan as King Mu – A wise king who is the 20th ruler of Bakjae and father of King Ui-Ja
Cha In-pyo as Mu-jin-Loyal subject of Bakjae and Gyebaeks father.
Shin Eun-jung as Queen Seonhwa – The 1st queen of King Mu and mother of King Ui-Ja
Jeon No-min as Sung-choong
Yoon Da-hoon as Dok-kye
Kim Yu-seok as Heung-soo
Go Yoon-hoo as Dae-soo
Lee Poong-woon as teen Dae-soo
Jang Hee-woong as Yong-soo 
Lee Chan-ho as teen Yong-soo
Jo Kyung-hoon as Baek-pa
Yoon Won-seok as Po-deuk
Park Sung-woong as Kim Yushin
Ahn Gil-kang as Kwi-woon
Jung Sung-mo as Yoon-choong
Kim Byung-ki as Sa Taek Jeok Deok
Kwon Yong-woon as Chun-dol
Jo Sang-ki as Nam-jo
Kim Joong-ki as Ki-mi
Seo Beom-sik as Sa-gul
Choi Jae-ho as Ui-jik
Kim Dong-hee as Eun-sang
Im Hyun-sik as Yeon Moon-jin
Soon Dong-woon as Jin-kook
Lee Byung-sik as Hyub-jong
Jung Han-heon as Baek-eun
Jung Ki-sung as Yeon Choong-min
Chae Hee-jae as Cho Raeng-yi
Lee Tae-kyung as vestal
Lee Han-wi as Im-ja
Oh Ji-young as Jung-hwa
Choi Ran as Young-myo
Ryu Je-hee as Hyo-so
Park Yu-hwan as Buk-jo
Kim Hyeseon as Eul-nyeo
Kim Hyun-sung as Moon-geun 
Lee Tae-ri as teen Moon-geun 
Kim Yoo-jin as Yeol-bae
Lee Dong-kyu as Kim Chunchu-Next in line for the crown of Silla after Queen Seondeok
Han Ji-woo as Yeon Tae-yeon
Jung So-young as Myung-joo
Kwak Min-seok as Mok Han-deok
Kang Chul-sung as Yushin's senior

Notes

Awards and nominations

International broadcast
  Vietnam: VTC9 - Let's Viet - aired from January 23, 2015.
  Iran: IRIB Namayesh TV - aired from June 6, 2015 to July 15, 2015
 Thailand: 3 Family (in a network of Channel 3) - starting August 25, 2016

References

External links
  
 
 

2011 South Korean television series debuts
2011 South Korean television series endings
MBC TV television dramas
South Korean historical television series
South Korean action television series
Television series set in Baekje
Television shows set in South Chungcheong Province